Eugnosta emarcida is a species of moth of the family Tortricidae. It is found in Honduras and Mexico.

References

Moths described in 1986
Eugnosta